Mario Dante Agodino (c. 1917 – 1975) was Provisional Governor of Córdoba, Argentina from 28 February 1974 to 25 March 1974.

References 

Governors of Córdoba Province, Argentina
1975 deaths
Place of birth missing
1917 births